Castel San Pietro Romano is a  (municipality) in the Metropolitan City of Rome in the Italian region of Latium, located about  east of Rome. In 2017, it had a population of 883.

Since 14 November 2017, Castel San Pietro Romano has been included in the club of the most beautiful villages in Italy, and in the same year it received the "Comune Riciclone del Lazio" award from Legambiente.

On 12 October 2018, the country had its first honorary citizen, Gina Lollobrigida.

References

External links
 Official website

Cities and towns in Lazio